AMBER is the acronym of AMerican Bridge for the Excellence in Research with Europe. This project started on 1 January 2013, and will finish at the end of 2014.

The increasing exchange between LAC (Latin American Countries) and European countries in the last decades makes some initiatives more attractive than others. Among them,  is considered the access point to attractive research careers in Europe. With more than 200 centers located in 38 European countries, the EURAXESS service centers support the mobility of researchers and aim to secure better working conditions for researchers in Europe.

The aim of AMBER is the implementation of precise and sustainable actions to increase researchers’ mobility between Latin America and Europe.

To reach this general primary objective, three secondary goals are defined:
 To provide access to qualified information, in the "knowledge triangle" (education, science and technology, and innovation).
 To minimize problems caused by existing administrative barriers (immigration, homologation, recruitment procedures, etc.). This activity will benefit the researcher and his family both prior to and during the stay.
 To improve the quality of assistance by supporting the Career Development Plan of researchers in their stay in Europe, and to raise the quality of the assistance provided, through the implementation of a Training Plan provided by mobility managers in scientific cooperation with Latin America.

There are five members of the EURAXESS network: Spain, Portugal, France, Italy and United Kingdom.

External links
 AMBER Official website 

Research projects